Scene 23 was an American pop group formed by the winners of the reality television series Popstars 2, which aired on The WB Television Network in the fall of 2001.

The original lineup of Scene 23 consisted of six members, three males and three females: Josh Henderson (background vocals), Donavan Green (lead vocals), Moises Juarez (background vocals), Monika Christian (lead and background vocals), Laurie Gidosh (lead and background vocals)  and Dorothy Szamborska (background vocals). During the run of the show, producers David Stanley and Scott Stone kicked Moises Juarez out of the group.

Scene 23 only recorded seven tracks for the series soundtrack album, Popstars 2: Introducing Scene 23. The album was heavily padded with covers from other artists, and included several tracks of people talking about the Popstars audition process set to music. While the track "I Really Don’t Think So" was chosen as the first single and the group filmed a music video for the song, it was only released commercially as a single by the Dutch band K-otic. Their version appeared on their debut album Bulletproof as part of the Dutch show Starmaker.

Discography
2001: Music From The Show Popstars 2: Introducing Scene 23
 "I Wanna Be A Popstar"
 "He Said She Said"
 "The Greatest"
 "I Really Don't Think So"
 "All This Love"
 "What She Got"
 "Another Night"
 "Respect Me"
 "Nervewracking"
 "I Believe I Can Fly"
 "Judged"
 "I Still Believe"
 "I Wanna Know"
 "Boot Camp"

American pop music groups
Popstars winners
Musical groups established in 2001
Musical groups disestablished in 2002